Being There is a 1979 film directed by Hal Ashby.

Being There may also refer to:

 Being There (novel), a 1970 novel by Jerzy Kosinski; basis for the film
 Being There (Tord Gustavsen album), 2007
 Being There (Wilco album), 1996
 Being There: Putting Brain, Body and World Together Again, a 1997 book by Andy Clark

See also
 Dasein (English: "being there"), a philosophical concept associated with Martin Heidegger